Nate Salley, Jr. (born February 5, 1984) is a former American football safety. He was originally drafted by the Carolina Panthers in the fourth round of the  2006 NFL Draft. He played college football and college basketball at Ohio State.

Early years
He was a two sport star at St. Thomas Aquinas High School in Fort Lauderdale. Salley was a member both the football and basketball state championship teams at St. Thomas Aquinas before graduating in 2002.

External links

JustSportsStats.com profile of Nate Salley (NFL and UFL stats)

1984 births
Living people
Players of American football from Fort Lauderdale, Florida
Salley, Nate
American football safeties
Ohio State Buckeyes football players
Carolina Panthers players
Florida Tuskers players